In the U.S. state of Oregon, there are two systems for categorizing roads in the state highway system: named state highways and numbered state routes.  Named highways, such as the Pacific Highway No. 1 or the North Umpqua Highway East No. 138, are primarily used internally by the Oregon Department of Transportation (ODOT) whereas numbered routes, such as Interstate 5 (I-5), U.S. Highway 20 (US 20), or Oregon Route 140 (OR 140), are posted on road signs and route markers.  The two systems overlap significantly, but the route numbers are not necessarily coterminous with highway names and some routes may comprise several highways. For example, OR 47 is overlaid on the Mist–Clatskanie Highway No. 110, Nehalem Highway No. 102, and Tualatin Valley Highway No. 29.  In addition to OR 47, the Tualatin Valley Highway No. 29 also comprises part of OR 8.


Mainline routes

Special routes

References

 
State routes